Dame de Gosnai was a woman trouvère. She may have been a member of the Puy d'Arras (13th century).

References
Notes

Bibliography

13th-century French women writers
13th-century French poets
13th-century women composers
French women poets
Trouvères
Medieval women poets